Waihai railway station, formerly known as Jianghai railway sation during planning, is an elevated station on the Guangzhou-Zhuhai intercity railway Jiangmen Spur Line.

The station is located at the junction of Qianjin Village and Qidong Village in Waihai Subdistrict, Jianghai District, Jiangmen, Guangdong Province, China, opposite Guzhen, Zhongshan across the river. It is the first station in Jiangmen for trains heading into the city.

References

Jiangmen